Jemison High School is a new  public high school in Huntsville, Alabama, United States. It is named for Mae Jemison, a native of nearby Decatur, Alabama who was the first African-American female astronaut.

The school is built on the same campus as McNair Junior High School, which is named for the late Ronald McNair, the second African-American astronaut in space, who was killed in the explosion of the space shuttle Challenger.

The school contains a magnet program called the College Academy which works alongside The University of Alabama in Huntsville to provide students with college credit throughout high school.

The mascot of Jemison High School is the Jaguars.

The school replaces J.O. Johnson High School, which closed its doors at the end of the 2015–16 school year.

Jemison Highschool is a 6A school.

Administration
Principal: Demetris Harris-Leverette, PhD 
Assistant Principal: Patrick Holder 
Dean of Students: Kelvis White 
College Academy Dean: Patrick Holder

College Academy 
The College Academy is a magnet program that allows students to obtain up to 60 college credit hours as a student in high school. Partnered with the University of Alabama in Huntsville, the students have the opportunity to attend classes on campus. This allows students to be prepared for college and get a head start on their major.

As an incentive, all students that graduate from the College Academy will be able to keep any scholarship that they receive for the next 4 years. Students who choose to continue at University of Alabama in Huntsville will have a chance to use that scholarship toward a master's degree.  If the students attend somewhere else, there is no guarantee of a scholarship.

See also
List of high schools in Alabama

References

High schools in Huntsville, Alabama
Schools in Madison County, Alabama
Public high schools in Alabama